Afioga Toleafoa Talitimu (died October 1980) was a Western Samoan songwriter and politician. He was a member of the Legislative Assembly in three spells between 1964 and his death, also serving as Speaker from 1973 until 1975.

Biography
Talitimu was one of three well-known Iiga songwriter brothers, alongside Gatoloai Peseta Sio. He was elected to the Legislative Assembly from the Fa'asaleleaga No. 3 constituency in 1964. He was defeated by Su'a Aloese in the 1967 elections and unsuccessfully challenged him again in 1970.

In the 1973 elections he defeated Aloese by six votes. Following the elections, he was elected Speaker with 28 votes, defeating Leaupepe Faimaala (12) and Teo Fetu (6). However, he lost his seat in the 1976 elections when he was defeated by Unasa Ioane. In the 1979 elections he returned to the Legislative Assembly, and was a candidate for the deputy speakership, losing by 23 votes to 24 to Aeau Taulupoo.

He died in Faga on Savai'i island in October 1980 at the age of 62.

References

Samoan musicians
Members of the Legislative Assembly of Samoa
Speakers of the Legislative Assembly of Samoa
1980 deaths